The 1999–2000 Combined Counties Football League season was the 22nd in the history of the Combined Counties Football League, a football competition in England.

League table
The league featured 20 clubs from the previous season, along with one new club:
Chessington United, joined from the Surrey County Premier League

Also, Viking Sports changed their name to Viking Greenford.

External links
 Combined Counties League Official Site

1999-2000
1999–2000 in English football leagues